Big Land, Flying Eagles (Mandarin: 大地飛鷹 Dàdì fēi yīng; literally Earth Eagle) is a 1978 Taiwanese Spaghetti Western-sequel desert intrigue adventure martial arts film directed by Ulysses Au-Yeung Jun. The film introduces Wang Kuan-Hsiung, Ling Yun, Paul Chang Chung and Sek Fung in lead roles.

Plot 
Xiao Fung, a notable swordsman, has killed the son of a local warlord, Lee San, and the 3,000,000 tael that Lee’s son was transporting, now seems to have gone missing. Xiao Fung is now marked for death by Lee San, but finds protection from “Killer Eagle” another swordsman of great repute, and a band of nomadic Mongolian traders. Nevertheless, Lee sends killers of unusual backgrounds, including Buddhist monks, to hunt Xiao Fung down, while Xiao Fung seems curiously preoccupied with a woman who’s embroiled in unstated conflicts with practically everybody.

Cast 
 Wang Kuan-Hsiung as Xiao Fung
 Ling Yun as Bu Ying
 Paul Chang Chung as Lee San
 Sek Fung as Bancha Banou
 Lee Seung as Shui Yin
 Lily Lan Yu-Li as Bo Wa
 Liu Ping as Wei Tian-Peng
 Ha Ling-Ling as Yang Guang
 Huang Hsiang-Lien
 Chang Chi-Ping as Blind fighter
 Ching Kuo-Chung as Mongolian fighter
 Cheung Cheung
 Li Min-Lang as Mongolian fighter
 O Yau-Man as Abbot
 Wang Tai-Lang
 Ko Pooi-Hei
 Ng Ho
 Cheng Fu-Hung
 Wong Wai
 Tang Chia-Chuan as Monk
 Cheung Shu-Lam
 Leung Fung
 Hau Lung
 Hung Bo-Chu
 Lui Wan-Biu

Production 
This film is set on the Mongolian-Chinese border.

Reception 
The film received a mixed reception.

External links 
 
 
 

Films based on works by Gu Long
1978 films